Grant Brits (born 11 August 1987) is a South African-born competition swimmer who represented Australia at various international championship events including at the 2008 Summer Olympics in Beijing where he secured an Olympic bronze medal. Brits later worked in investment banking and finance, and as of 2018 ran the superannuation fund Superestate.

Swimming career

Beijing Olympics 2008 
Brits was selected in the squad for the 4 × 200-metre freestyle relay for the 2008 Summer Olympics. He helped Australia qualify sixth in the heats where he was the fastest of the four heats swimmers. This effort resulted in the selectors deciding to retain him for the final of the 4 × 200-metre freestyle relay. He swam the third leg of the relay, the Australians managed to secure a surprise bronze in the event; handing Brits his first Olympic Medal.

Other Swimming Achievements 
Brits also held a world record. In 2007 Brits was part of the team that set a new world record the 4 × 200 metre freestyle short-course relay. They completed the course in 6 min 52.66 s.

At the 2007 World Aquatics Championships in Melbourne, Brits competed in the 4 × 200 m freestyle relay. He swam the third leg in the heats, posting a time of 1 min 48.73 s to help Australia qualify second fastest for the final. He retained his position for the final, where he again swam the third leg. He maintained third place throughout his leg, and ended with a silver medal when Kenrick Monk overtook his Canadian counterpart on the anchor leg.

Brits' mother, Jeanette, swam for South Africa in the 1970s.

Professional career 
Grant Brits completed a Bachelor of Commerce and a Bachelor of Applied Finance at Macquarie University. After University Brits began his professional career in Investment Banking.

See also 
 List of Olympic medalists in swimming (men)
 World record progression 4 × 200 metres freestyle relay.

References

1987 births
Living people
Olympic swimmers of Australia
Swimmers at the 2008 Summer Olympics
Olympic bronze medalists for Australia
World record setters in swimming
Olympic bronze medalists in swimming
Australian male freestyle swimmers
World Aquatics Championships medalists in swimming
Medalists at the FINA World Swimming Championships (25 m)
Medalists at the 2008 Summer Olympics
People educated at Oakhill College